Tabas is a city in South Khorasan Province, Iran.

Tabas may also refer to:
 Tabas, Razavi Khorasan, a village in Razavi Khorasan province
 Tabas-e Masina, a city in Darmian County, South Khorasan province
 Tabas-e Masina Rural District, Darmian County, South Khorasan province
 Tabas County, in South Khorasan province
 Tabas Rural District, in Razavi Khorasan province